Calochromus is a genus of net-winged beetles in the family Lycidae. There are at least 20 described species in Calochromus.

Species
These 20 species belong to the genus Calochromus:

 Calochromus conveniens Kleine, 1926
 Calochromus dimidiatus LeConte, 1875
 Calochromus diversus Kleine, 1925
 Calochromus fervens LeConte, 1881
 Calochromus formosanus Nakane
 Calochromus harauensis
 Calochromus kelantanensis
 Calochromus macropalpis Kleine, 1926
 Calochromus nagaii
 Calochromus pallidulus Kleine, 1926
 Calochromus perfacetus (Say, 1825)
 Calochromus rubrovestitus
 Calochromus ruficollis LeConte, 1875
 Calochromus samuelsoni
 Calochromus sangkangensis
 Calochromus shirozui Nakane
 Calochromus slevini Van Dyke, 1918
 Calochromus sororius Kleine, 1926
 Calochromus subparallelus Pic
 Calochromus sungkangensis Nakane

References

Further reading

External links 

 Images & occurrence data from GBIF.

Lycidae
Articles created by Qbugbot
Taxa named by Félix Édouard Guérin-Méneville